In video games and entertainment systems, a motion controller is a type of game controller that uses accelerometers or other sensors to track motion and provide input.

History
Motion controllers using accelerometers are used as controllers for video games, which was made more popular since 2006 by the Wii Remote controller for Nintendo's Wii console, which uses accelerometers to detect its approximate orientation and acceleration, and serves an image sensor, so it can be used as a pointing device. It was followed by other similar wand-based devices, including the ASUS Eee Stick, Sony PlayStation Move (which also uses magnetometers to track the Earth's magnetic field and computer vision via the PlayStation Eye to aid in position tracking), Joy-Con, and HP Swing. The PlayStation 3's first controller, the Sixaxis, included motion sensing at the notable loss of haptic feedback (vibration) due to interference concerns; these features were both included on the later DualShock 3. Other systems use different mechanisms for input, such as Microsoft's Kinect, which combines infrared structured light and computer vision, and the Razer Hydra, which uses a magnetic field to determine position and orientation.

The Sega AM2 arcade game Hang-On, designed by Yu Suzuki, was controlled using a video game arcade cabinet resembling a motorbike, which the player moved with their body. This began the "Taikan" trend, the use of motion-controlled hydraulic arcade cabinets in many arcade games of the late 1980s, two decades before motion controls became popular on video game consoles. The Sega Activator, based on the Light Harp invented by Assaf Gurner, an Israeli musician and Kung Fu martial artist who researched inter disciplinarian concepts to create the experience of playing an instrument using the whole body's motion, was released for the Mega Drive (Genesis) in 1993. It could read the player's physical movements and was the first controller to allow full-body motion sensing, The original invention related to a 3 octaves musical instrument that could interpret the user's gestures into musical notes via MIDI protocol. The invention was registered as patent initially in Israel on May 11, 1989, after 5 years of R&D. In 1992 the first complete Light Harp was created by Assaf Gurner and Oded Zur and was presented to Sega of America, However, it was a commercial failure due to its "unwieldiness and inaccuracy". Another early motion-sensing device was the Sega VR headset, first announced in 1991. It featured built-in sensors that tracked the player's movement and head position, but was never officially released. Another early example is the 2000 light gun shooter arcade game Police 911, which used motion sensing technology to detect the player's movements, which are reflected by the player character within the game. The Atari Mindlink was an early proposed motion controller for the Atari 2600, which measured the movement of the user's eyebrows with a fitted headband.

Notable controllers
 Wii Remote (Wii and Wii U)
 Sixaxis (PlayStation 3)
 DualShock 3, 4 and DualSense (PlayStation 3, PlayStation 4 and PlayStation 5)
 PlayStation Move (PlayStation 3, PlayStation 4 and PlayStation 5)
 Wii U GamePad (Wii U)
 Kinect (Xbox 360 and Xbox One)
 Razer Hydra
 Xavix
 Joy-Con and Nintendo Switch Pro Controller (Nintendo Switch)
 Steam Controller
 Steam Deck

See also
3D motion controller
Flick Stick
Gesture recognition
Motion capture
Virtual reality headset

References

Game controllers
American inventions